Life or Death is a 1954 Egyptian film directed by Kamal El Sheikh. It was entered into the 1955 Cannes Film Festival.

Cast
 Imad Hamdi
 Youssef Wahby
 Madiha Yousri

References

External links

1954 films
1950s Arabic-language films
Egyptian black-and-white films
Films directed by Kamal El Sheikh